The A9 highway is a highway in Lithuania (Magistraliniai keliai). It runs from Panevėžys, through Radviliškis to Šiauliai.  The length of the road is 78.94 kilometres.
The speed limit for most of the road's length is 90 km/h. This route is a part of International E-road network (part of European route E272).

The stretch of the road between Radviliškis and Šiauliai is modern expressway, with limited access and a 120 km/h speed limit. There are also distant plans to build an expressway to Šeduva, bypassing Radviliškis.

References

Roads in Lithuania